The Ontario Hockey League Showcase Cup (more commonly known as the OHL Cup) is a tournament hosted by the Ontario Hockey League and operated by the Greater Toronto Hockey League with the purpose of providing an additional scouting opportunity to minor midget players in Ontario, and other districts which fall under the Ontario Hockey League's draft region. It originally started as a Bantam tournament, however when age groups in Canada were realigned to match USA and International age classification the tournament was changed to a Minor Midget tournament. 

The OHL Cup Showcase Tournament features the top minor midget teams from Ontario, along with selected teams from the U.S.A. Invitations for the tournament will be extended to the champion and finalist from each division of the Ontario Hockey Federation and branches of the OHF, ODHA and Thunder Bay. All T.B.A. teams will be selected by the Tournament Selection Committee. In the event that a league/association champion or finalist does not take advantage of their qualification, the vacancy will similarly be determined by the Tournament Selection Committee. This year (2011)the Toronto Marlboros won the tournament led by Cody Thompson who was the leader in point for forwards and Chance Macdonald who was the leader in points for defenceman.

Registration
Registration to the OHL Cup is by both qualification and invitation. Each season, the number of automatic berths for each region in Ontario are set by the OHL with additional Ontario berths selected by a selection committee that monitors the progress and performance of teams during the season and publishes weekly ranking of the top ten teams. All US-based teams are also selected by committee.

Rules
Although the tournament bears the Ontario Hockey League name the tournament is played using Hockey Canada rules.

Champions

Awards
Tim Adams Memorial Trophy - Most Valuable player

References

External links
 OHL Cup Official Website
 OHL Cup information on the GTHL website

Ice hockey tournaments in Canada
Ontario Hockey League